Cold fire is a type of controlled burn frequently used in the Noongar Aboriginal culture of Western Australia to clear undergrowth and promote easier access and movement through the country.

The cold fire is of low intensity and does not damage the middle or upper layers of the bush. Allowing movement through the bush and access to sacred sites is vital for Noongar culture.  The cold fire also promotes a diversity of new growth, especially plant types that have a high food value, which in turn attracts animals to these areas.  Additionally the cold fire is used to maintain large tracts of grazing habitat which need to be coordinated in a mosaic pattern every two years.

Without these cool types of fire a dramatic ecological shift would occur like large areas in Tasmania which are now covered in thick scrub.

See also
 Fire-stick farming

References
 The creation of this article was via translation from the relevant section of the Nyungar Wikipedia article Karla (Fire)

Types of fire
Noongar
Land management in Australia
Habitat management equipment and methods